Paonias macrops is a species of moth of the  family Sphingidae. It is known from Mexico.

References

Paonias
Moths described in 1933